Norman Deane (29 August 1875 – 30 September 1950) was an Australian cricketer. He played four first-class matches for New South Wales between 1902/03 and 1908/09.

See also
 List of New South Wales representative cricketers

References

External links
 

1875 births
1950 deaths
Australian cricketers
New South Wales cricketers
Cricketers from Sydney